English electronic music group the Prodigy has released seven studio albums, one live album, one compilation album, one mix album, three extended plays, twenty-one singles, and twenty-two music videos. Hailed as pioneers of genres such as rave, techno, and big beat, the group have sold over twenty million albums worldwide. As of 9 November 2018 their UK album sales stood at 4,707,982.

The Prodigy's first release was the 1991 EP What Evil Lurks. Experience, the group's debut studio album, was released in September 1992, peaking at number 12 in the United Kingdom and certified platinum by the British Phonographic Industry (BPI). Experience spawned the singles "Charly", "Everybody in the Place", "Fire" / "Jericho", "Out of Space" and "Wind It Up (Rewound)", all of which were top 12 hits in the United Kingdom. Music for the Jilted Generation, the group's second studio album, was released in July 1994. The album peaked at number one in the UK, also reaching the top ten in countries such as Australia and New Zealand. Earning a platinum certification from the BPI, Music for the Jilted Generation spawned the UK top ten singles "One Love" and "No Good (Start the Dance)".

The Prodigy's third studio album The Fat of the Land was released in June 1997, becoming a huge commercial success. The album peaked at number one in multiple countries, including the United Kingdom and the United States. The Fat of the Land received multi-platinum certifications from the BPI, the Australian Recording Industry Association (ARIA), and the Recording Industry Association of America (RIAA). "Firestarter", the album's first single, peaked at number one in the United Kingdom and hit the top ten in multiple other countries. It also gave the group their biggest hit in the United States, where it peaked at number 30 on the Billboard Hot 100 and was certified gold by the RIAA. The album's second single "Breathe" also performed well commercially, reaching the top ten in multiple countries and becoming the group's second consecutive UK number-one hit. "Smack My Bitch Up", the album's final single, peaked at number 8 in the UK.

The group released their fourth studio album Always Outnumbered, Never Outgunned in August 2004. Their style had changed from rave and breakbeat to more of an electronic rock style. The album topped the charts in the United Kingdom, earning a silver certification from the BPI. Always Outnumbered, Never Outgunned spawned three singles, including the UK top 20 hit "Girls". Invaders Must Die, the group's fifth studio album, was released in February 2009. The album became the band's fourth consecutive studio album to top the charts in the UK. Among its four singles were the UK top ten hits "Omen" and "Warrior's Dance", both of which received silver certifications from the BPI.

"Firestarter" re-entered the UK and US charts in March 2019 following the death of band member Keith Flint.

Albums

Studio albums

Live albums

Compilation albums

Mix albums

Extended plays

Singles

Promotional singles

Video albums

Music videos

References

External links
 Official website
 The Prodigy at AllMusic
 
 

Discographies of British artists
Rock music group discographies
Electronic music discographies
Discography